This is an alphabetical list of the names of all ships that have been in service with the Royal Navy, or with predecessor fleets formally in the service of the Kingdom of England or the Commonwealth of England. The list also includes fictional vessels which have prominently featured in literature about the Royal Navy.  Names are traditionally re-used over the years, and have been carried by more than one ship.

Altogether over 13,000 ships have been in service with the Royal Navy.

Unlike many other naval services, the Royal Navy designates certain types of shore establishment (e.g. barracks, naval air stations and training establishments) as "ships" and names them accordingly. These establishments are often referred to in service slang as stone frigates.

Lists of ship names

Due to the large number of names the list has been split into smaller lists:

Alphabetical
List of ship names of the Royal Navy (A)
List of ship names of the Royal Navy (B)
List of ship names of the Royal Navy (C)
List of ship names of the Royal Navy (D–F)
List of ship names of the Royal Navy (G–H)
List of ship names of the Royal Navy (I–L)
List of ship names of the Royal Navy (M–N)
List of ship names of the Royal Navy (O–Q)
List of ship names of the Royal Navy (R–T)
List of ship names of the Royal Navy (U–Z)

By type of ship

 List of aircraft carriers of the Royal Navy
 List of amphibious warfare ships of the Royal Navy
 List of pre-dreadnought battleships of the Royal Navy
 List of dreadnought battleships of the Royal Navy
 List of battlecruisers of the Royal Navy
 List of bomb vessels of the Royal Navy
 List of cruiser classes of the Royal Navy
 List of destroyers of the Royal Navy
 List of fast patrol boats of the Royal Navy
 List of frigates of the Royal Navy
 List of corvettes and sloops of the Royal Navy
 List of gunboats and gunvessels of the Royal Navy
 List of gun-brigs of the Royal Navy
 List of ironclads of the Royal Navy
 List of monitors of the Royal Navy
 List of mine countermeasure vessels of the Royal Navy (includes minesweepers and mine hunters)
 List of Royal Prison ship names
 List of Royal Fleet Auxiliary ship names
 List of ships of the line of the Royal Navy
 List of submarines of the Royal Navy
 List of survey vessels of the Royal Navy
 List of Royal Navy shore establishments

By namesake 

 List of people with Royal Navy ships named after them

Fictional RN ship names

Many novels and films about the Royal Navy feature fictional ships, but most use real names. This is a list of fictional names of note. Where real ship names are used fictionally, there is a link to the actual ships using that name.

Fictional wooden RN ships

In novels
 Argonaute (from Colours Aloft by Alexander Kent)
 Atropos (from Hornblower and the Atropos by C. S. Forester)
 Bellipotent (from Billy Budd, Sailor by Herman Melville)
 Caligula (from A Ship of the Line by C. S. Forester)
 Clam (from Hornblower in the West Indies by C. S. Forester)
 Clorinda  (from Hornblower in the West Indies by C. S. Forester)
 Crab (from Hornblower in the West Indies by C. S. Forester)
 Harvey and Moth (bomb ketches) (from The Commodore by C. S. Forester)
 Flame (from Lord Hornblower by C. S. Forester)
  (from a 1970s urban myth)
  (from Mr Midshipman Easy by Captain Frederick Marryat)
  (from Hornblower and the Hotspur by C. S. Forester)
 Justinian (from Mr. Midshipman Hornblower by C. S. Forester)
  (from The Commodore by C. S. Forester)
 Lydia (from The Happy Return by C. S. Forester)
  (from  Hornblower and the Atropos by C. S. Forester)
  (from The Commodore by C. S. Forester)
  (from Hornblower in the West Indies by C. S. Forester)
 Pinafore (from the operetta H.M.S. Pinafore by Gilbert and Sullivan)
 Polychrest (from Post Captain by Patrick O'Brian) 
 Porta Coeli (from Lord Hornblower by C. S. Forester)
 Pucelle (from Sharpe's Trafalgar by Bernard Cornwell)
  (from A Ship of the Line by C. S. Forester)
  (from Lieutenant Hornblower by C. S. Forester)
  (from Hornblower in the West Indies by C. S. Forester)
  (from Master and Commander by Patrick O'Brian; based on the actual )
  (from HMS Surprise by Patrick O'Brian; based on the actual frigate )
  (from A Ship of the Line and Flying Colours by C. S. Forester)
 Themis (from Under Enemy Colors by S. Thomas Russell)
  (from the scatalogical drinking song "Good Ship Venus"; although this usage is apocryphal, the ship name  has been used five times by the RN between 1758 and 1972)
 Witch of Endor (from Flying Colours by C. S. Forester)

In film, television and radio

  (from 1962 Peter Ustinov/Terence Stamp film Billy Budd)
  and Interceptor (from the 2003 film Pirates of the Caribbean: The Curse of the Black Pearl; a fictional HMS Dauntless is the "flagship of the Royal Navy"; HMS Interceptor – described as the "fastest vessel in the Navy" – is played by the replica ship Lady Washington). In later films Dauntless is replaced by Endeavour, the vessel that became a new flagship of the Royal Navy.
 Defiant (from 1962 Alec Guinness/Dirk Bogarde film HMS Defiant)
 Providence  (from the 2011 film Pirates of the Caribbean: On Stranger Tides; portrayed by replica ship HMS Surprise)
  (from 2003 Russell Crowe film Master and Commander;  portrayed by replica ship HMS Surprise )
 Travail (from the 1975 and 2015–2019 series Poldark)
  (from 1962 Kenneth Williams/Bernard Cribbins comedy film Carry On Jack)

Fictional metal RN ships

Pre-World War II

 The original 1920s edition of the H. P. Gibson naval board game Dover Patrol used a number of real RN ship names, but generally attached them to different ship classes. In the revised edition of the game published after World War II, the "Flagships" and "Vice Flagships" were unnamed, but all the other names shown above were retained, including the four wholly fictional county names given to the "Battleships" (reclassified from "Dreadnoughts").
  ("third-class cruiser"); also "H M Battlecruiser " and "her attendant light cruiser " (from the 1931 novel Brown on Resolution by C. S. Forester)
 Clampherdown (from The Ballad of the "Clampherdown" by Rudyard Kipling (1892); satirising the s  and )
  (an "ironclad torpedo ram" from the 1898 novel The War of the Worlds by H. G. Wells)

In World War II novels
  ( from The Cruiser by Warren Tute)
 Apache ( in the short story Gold From Crete by C. S. Forester)
  (from The Ship by C. S. Forester; inspired by  )
In the 1953 film version HMS Saltash was depicted by : , and hence named Saltash Castle)
 Compass Rose and Flower (s in the short story H M Corvette (1942) and the novel The Cruel Sea (1951) by Nicholas Monsarrat)
 Conqueror (battleship frequently referred to in the novel The Destroyers by Douglas Reeman; clearly based on )
 Dipper and Winger (Kingfisher-class corvettes in the stories East Coast Corvette (1943) and Corvette Command (1944), by Nicholas Monsarrat; republished with H M Corvette as Three Corvettes in 1945)
  (G-class destroyer in the novel Killing Ground by Douglas Reeman)
 Jubilee (minesweeper in Nicholas Monsarrat's unfinished final novel The Master Mariner)
 Lomond (leader of a flotilla of fictional V and W-class destroyers in the novel The Destroyers by Douglas Reeman)
  (from the short story "HMS Marlborough Will Enter Harbour" by Nicholas Monsarrat; based on a 1927 sloop) 
 Nairn (River-class frigate in Alistair MacLean's 1955 novel HMS Ulysses)
  (S-class destroyer in Alistair MacLean's novels The Guns of Navarone and Force 10 From Navarone)
  (from HMS Ulysses by Alistair MacLean, based on a fictional )
 Vagabond ( in the 1989 novel The Fighting Spirit by Charles Gidley (Wheeler))
 Viperous ( from the novel The Cruel Sea (1953) by Nicholas Monsarrat)
 Ventnor, Victor, Warden, Warlock, Waxwing, Whiplash and Whirlpool (members of a flotilla of fictional s in the novel The Destroyers by Douglas Reeman)
 Wildebeeste (almost certainly a destroyer, operating alongside the main character's unnamed destroyer in the novel Pincher Martin by William Golding)

In World War II films
In Nicholas Monsarrat's original book, HMS Saltash was a larger )
  (in the 1955 John Wayne film The Sea Chase; portrayed by River-class frigate ) 
 Sea Tiger (submarine, in the 1943 film We Dive at Dawn; portrayed by Turkish S-class submarines P614 and P615)
  (the only fictional ship in the 1960 Kenneth More film Sink the Bismarck!; portrayed by  )
 HMS Torrin (in the 1942 Noël Coward film In Which We Serve; portrayed by N-class destroyer )

Post-war novels
 Aries ( from The Zhukov Briefing by Antony Trew)
  (Type 23 frigate in Mike Lunnon-Wood's novel King's Shilling)
 Belligerent (assault ship from The Zhukov Briefing by Antony Trew)
 Bluewhale (Porpoise-class submarine from The Zhukov Briefing by Antony Trew)
 Carousel (from We Saw the Sea by John Winton; based on s in the Dartmouth Training Squadron)
  (aircraft carrier from the novel HMS Leviathan by John Winton; the real Majestic-class carrier with this name was never completed)
  (an "obsolete frigate" in the 1988 novel Medusa by Hammond Innes)
  ( from One of our Warships by John Winton)
  (submarine from Down the Hatch and All the Nice Girls by John Winton)
  (fictional  from The Fighting Temeraire by John Winton)

Post-war film and media
 Aristotle (from the 1958 Frankie Howerd comedy film Further Up the Creek; portrayed by a Type 14 frigate)
  (from 1957 Peter Sellers comedy film Up the Creek, portrayed by  )
 Dorchester (in the 1960 Norman Wisdom film The Bulldog Breed, portrayed by a Type 14 )
 Gillingham (from the 1956 John Mills film The Baby and the Battleship, portrayed by )
  (from the 1970s BBC drama series Warship; portrayed by the Leander-class frigate , among others)
 Makepeace (generic destroyer from the 1960s radio comedy The Navy Lark)
  (Type 23 frigate in the Action Stations exhibit at Portsmouth Historic Dockyard)
  ( in the 1977 James Bond film The Spy Who Loved Me)
 Sherwood (in the 1957 A. E. Matthews comedy film Carry on Admiral; portrayed by a )
  (from the 2004 ITV drama series Making Waves; portrayed by the Type 23 frigate  and others)
 Troutbridge (from the 1959–1977 radio comedy The Navy Lark; inspired by the Type 15 frigate).   
 Trumpton (in the 1959 film version of The Navy Lark; the action is transferred to an inshore minesweeper, portrayed by )
 Vigil ( from the BBC drama Vigil)
 Virtue ( mentioned in the BBC drama Vigil)

See also
Bibliography of 18th–19th century Royal Naval history

Notes

References
 

 Names
Royal Navy names 
Royal Navy ships